Malin is a village in County Donegal, Ireland, situated 6 km (4 mi) north of Carndonagh. A further 13 km (8 mi) north further is Malin Head, the most northerly point of the island of Ireland
. Malin won the Irish Tidy Towns Competition in 1970 and 1991. It was a planned settlement plotted around a triangular green.

Sport
The town's GAA club, also called Malin, is considered a senior football club; it is the most northern-located GAA club in Ireland.

The Malin 5k run is held annually, and there is also a raft race which takes place to raise funds for the RNLI.

Tidy towns
Malin has won the Tidy Towns contest twice, and earned a Bronze in 2002.

Notable people
 The Irish folk music trio The Henry Girls are from Malin.
The Rev. William Elder, politician and clergyman in Canada
 Sir William McArthur, Lord Mayor of London

See also
 List of populated places in the Republic of Ireland
 List of towns and villages in Northern Ireland

References

External links
 The Tidy Towns of Ireland "Celebrating 50 years"
 

Towns and villages in County Donegal